Garra arunachalami is a species of fish that was described by J.A. Johnson and Soranam (2001). It is included in the genus Garra and the carp family. The IUCN categorizes the species as critically endangered. No subspecies are listed in the Catalogue of Life. It is sometimes placed in the genus Horalabiosa.

References 

Garra
Fish described in 2001